High Point High School (HPHS) is a public high school located in Beltsville, an unincorporated section of Prince George's County, Maryland, United States. The school, serving children in grades 9 through 12, is part of the Prince George's County Public Schools district system.

It is outside Interstate 495 (Capital Beltway) and in proximity to Interstate 95.

History
Opened in fall 1954, High Point High School was originally going to be named Cherry Hill High School. However, school officials eventually settled on the name "High Point High School" because of the school's location on what residents believed to be the highest point in the county. Upon its opening High Point High began serving Greenbelt, and the former Greenbelt High School became Greenbelt Junior High School. By the late 1950s High Point used a "split class" system as it was over capacity. Greenbelt is now served by Eleanor Roosevelt High School, which was scheduled to open in fall 1976.

During the period of Michael Brooks as principal some parents and students stated that his responses to incidents of fighting and truant students were insufficient. In 2011 the district placed the assistant principal, as an interim principal after a video of a fight at the school appeared on YouTube.

In 2014 the district's board agreed to do a feasibility study on building a new school building. By 2017 the existing building had 2,700 students when it was designed for around 2,100 students.

Demographics
The demographic breakdown of the 2,426 students enrolled for the 2014–2015 school year was:
Male - 55.9%
Female - 44.1%
Native American/Alaskan - 0.1%
Asian/Pacific islanders - 3.8%
Black - 28.0%
Hispanic - 65.1%
White - 2.2%
Multiracial - 0.8%

75.6% of the students qualified for free or reduced lunch. This is a Title I school.

As of 2006 many residents of northern PG County are of Hispanic and Latino ancestry, contributing to a large enrollment of Hispanic and Latino students at High Point High. In 2016 Sandra Jimenez, the principal at the time, described the school as a "Central American Ellis Island" in an interview with NPR.

Communities within the school's attendance zone include: the unincorporated census designated places (CDP) of Adelphi, Beltsville, and Langley Park, and portions of the CDPs of Chillum and Konterra, as well as the sections of Calverton and Hillandale CDPs in PG County. Also within the boundary is a portion of the City of College Park. Scott, et al. stated in a 2014 paper published by think tank The Urban Institute that, as of March 2013, 23% of High Point students came from Langley Park.

Academics
In 1987 the largest English as a second language (ESOL) program in the school district was in High Point High; this program began in 1969, and the school in 1987 had the largest population of students originating from outside the United States of any PG County high school.  the ESOL program includes ESOL 1–3, Advanced Critical Reading, AIM, Language of American History, Language of Math, and Language of Science classes.

In 1987 it had classes in six foreign languages, and the school district was considering making High Point a magnet school for foreign languages. That year it received 200% of the number of requests for transferring into the school that each other PG County high school got.

Student discipline
A paper in 2014 by Scott et al. stated that High Point students, compared to students of other high schools in the district, "have a less positive perception of school safety and discipline".

In the 2011–12 school year 36% of 9th grade students from Langley Park, who attended High Point, did not go to school for at least 20 days per school year compared to 29% district average for 9th graders and 10% district average for 7th and 8th graders; the Langley Park 7th and 8th graders truancy rate was the same as the district average. Scott, et al. stated that a possible reason was that start time of High Point was the same as that of Buck Lodge Middle School even though the high school's distance from Langley Park was  longer than that of the middle school.

Athletics
High Point High has an American football team. In 2013 Chelsea Janes of The Washington Post stated it had been "a long time since" the team had performed strongly, but that it was regaining its power.

Notable alumni
Frank Cho (1990), comic book writer and illustrator
A. Jamie Cuticchia, scientist
Raheem DeVaughn, musician
Fred Funk, former coach of University of Maryland golf team and PGA tour player
Kevin Jordan, NFL player
Jolene Ivey, Maryland state legislator
Elijah Joy, TV personality
Brian Reid (1966), internet innovator 
Doug Spearman, actor
Paula Vogel (1969), playwright
Martin Berkofsky (1961) American classical pianist

Notes

Further reading
 High Point High School Feasibility Study, June 2014
 Board Action Summary (BAS) for High Point Feasibility"

External links

 
  School district website

References

Beltsville, Maryland
Public high schools in Maryland
Educational institutions established in 1954
Schools in Prince George's County, Maryland
1954 establishments in Maryland